The 1980 Hawaii Rainbow Warriors football team was an American football team that represented the University of Hawaii in the Western Athletic Conference (WAC) during the 1980 NCAA Division I-A football season. In their fourth season under head coach Dick Tomey, the Rainbow Warriors compiled an 8–3 record (3–3 against WAC opponents), placed third in the WAC, and outscored opponents by a total of 260 to 212.

The team's statistical leaders included Mike Stennis with 869 passing yards, Gary Allen with 864 rushing yards, Ron Pennick with 282 receiving yards, and Jim Asmus with 68 point scored (13 field goals and 29 extra points).

Schedule

References

Hawaii
Hawaii Rainbow Warriors football seasons
Hawaii Rainbow Warriors football